Uma is 2018 Indian Bengali-language drama film directed by Srijit Mukherji, under the banner of SVF Entertainment Pvt Ltd, starring Jisshu Sengupta, Sara Sengupta, Anjan Dutt, Srabanti Chatterjee, Sayantika Banerjee, Anirban Bhattacharya and Rudranil Ghosh. The movie was released on 1 June 2018.

Plot
In the film, a young girl, Uma (Sara Sengupta) living in Switzerland, is fighting for her life with a terminal disease. She wants to see Durga Puja of Kolkata, the biggest celebrated festival in Bengali culture. Himadri Sen, her father (Jisshu Sengupta) takes her to Kolkata to fulfill her dream by planning to set up a fake Durga Puja. Her father and family struggle much to make his daughter's dreams come true and find a director called Brahmananda Chakraborty (Anjan Dutt). The failed director sees this as his opportunity to create a masterpiece, by helping a dying girl. The director at first didn't agree to the proposal of the father. Later after remembering his past and how he couldn't make his son's life a beautiful one, the director goes to the residency of Jisshu Sengupta and gives a proposal to creating the 
Durga Puja after a brief talking. Jisshu Sengupta agrees in the proposal and the director goes on to create a false set of Durga Puja. During this, they face many problems to make Uma's dream true. In the end they all succeeds and uma and her father returns back to their home.

The plot is based on true events surrounding the life and death of Evan Leversage, who lived in St George in Ontario, Canada.

Cast
 Sara Sengupta as Uma

 Jisshu Sengupta as Himadri Sen
 Anjan Dutt as Brahmananda
 Srabanti Chatterjee as Mariyam (Acting as Menoka, the mother of Uma)
 Sayantika Banerjee as Menoka (Real mother of Uma)
 Rudranil Ghosh as Gobindo
 Anirban Bhattacharya as Mohitosh Sur
 Babul Supriyo as Mahesh 
 Gargi Roychowdhury as Medha
 Sujan Mukhopadhyay as Barun
 Nibedita Mukherjee as Meera
 Abhijit Guha
 Ambarish Bhattacharya
 Sayantani Guhathakurta
Beas Dhar
 Srijit Mukherjee as Indra

Special appearance
 Prosenjit Chatterjee
 Dev
 Nusrat Jahan
 Mimi Chakraborty
 Mir Afsar Ali (Mirchi Mir)
 Arindam Sil
 Kamaleshwar Mukherjee
 Raj Chakraborty
 Manoj Mitra

Soundtrack

The music and lyrics of the film are composed by Anupam Roy.

References

External links
 

2018 films
Bengali-language Indian films
2010s Bengali-language films
Films directed by Srijit Mukherji
Films scored by Anupam Roy
Indian drama films
2018 drama films